A concierge is an employee of a multi-tenant building, such as a hotel or apartment building, who receives guests. The concept has been applied more generally to other hospitality settings and to personal concierges who manage the errands of private clients.

Duties and functions

The concierge serves guests of an apartment building, hotel, or office building with duties similar to those of a receptionist. The position can also be maintained by a security guard over the late night shift. In medieval times, the concierge was an officer of the king who was charged with executing justice, with the help of his bailiffs. Later on in the 18th century, the concierge was a high official of the kingdom, appointed by the king to maintain order and oversee the police and prisoner records.

In 19th-century and early 20th-century apartment buildings, particularly in Paris, the concierge was known as a "Suisse", as the post was often filled by Swiss people. They often had a small apartment on the ground floor, called la loge, and were able to monitor all comings and goings. However, such settings are now extremely rare; most concierges in small or middle-sized buildings have been replaced by the part-time services of door-staff. Some larger apartment buildings or groups of buildings retain the use of concierges. The concierge may, for instance, keep the mail of absented dwellers, be entrusted with the apartment keys to deal with emergencies when residents are absent, provide information to residents and guests, provide access control, enforce rules, and act as a go-between for residents and management when management is not on-site.

A modern concierge may also serve as a lifestyle manager, like a secretary or a personal assistant.

In hotels or resorts, a concierge assists guests by performing various tasks such as making restaurant reservations, booking hotels, arranging for spa services, recommending night life hot spots, booking transportation (like taxi, limousines, airplanes, boats, etc.), coordinating porter service (luggage assistance request), procuring tickets to special events, and assisting with various travel arrangements and tours of local attractions. Concierges also assist with sending and receiving parcels.

Services
In hospitals, concierge services are becoming increasingly available. A hospital concierge provides similar services to those of a hotel concierge, but serves patients and employees as well. This helps hospital employees who work long shifts, and helps to provide work-life balance.

There are numerous independent personal concierge companies that provide errand services and information services for their members. Services include informational requests, setting dinner reservations, making telephone calls, researching travel arrangements and more. Typically, concierge companies will bill on an hourly rate, and depending upon the type of task, fees can vary drastically. Other companies bill a flat monthly fee based upon the number of requests a member is allowed to place each month. In the United Kingdom, since the year 2000 and as of 2010, concierge has become a key marketing and loyalty tool in the banking sector and offered as a benefit on luxury credit cards. This service offering is also known as lifestyle management. Concierges also entertain their clients.

Additionally, concierge services are now frequently offered as a service by financial institutions to their most valuable clients as way of retaining and attracting clients. Lifestyle and travel concierge companies  often offer their service as a white-label or semi-branded product on a business-to-business-to-consumer (B2B2C) basis.  Banks who currently offer concierge services to clients include Coutts, China Merchants Bank, RBC and HSBC.

Airport concierge services help travellers make it through security, customs, and immigration faster, and provide lounge access. 

The owners and operators of concierge, lifestyle management and errand service businesses are supported and advocated by the non-profit International Concierge and Lifestyle Management Association (ICLMA) and the National Concierge Association.

Etymology
The French word concierge is likely derived from the Old French cumcerges, itself related to the Medieval Latin consergius or the Latin conservus ("fellow slave").

Another possibility, suggested by French authors as early as the 19th century, is that "concierge" is a contraction of comte des cierges ("count of candles"), a servant responsible for maintaining the lighting and cleanliness of medieval palaces.

See also
 Concierge medicine
 Doorman
 Property caretaker
 Receptionist
 Shopping concierge
 Duty officer

References

External links

Hospitality occupations